Bangladesh Military Academy (BMA) is the miliraty training institute for the officer cadets of Bangladesh Army. It is located in Bhatiary, near Chittagong Hill Tracts, in the Chittagong District of south-east Bangladesh, about 13 kilometers north of Chittagong. The academy is situated on the slopes of the Sitakunda hill ranges and the shore of the Bay of Bengal.

History
Following the independence of Bangladesh with the break-up of Pakistan in the Bangladesh Liberation War of 1971, Bangladesh Military Academy was established in January 1974 for training the officers of the Army. The Military Academy was opened by the initiative of the then Prime Minister Sheikh Mujibur Rahman. The academy was initially raised at Cumilla Cantonment on 29 November 1973 and later relocated to Bhatiary, Chattogram in 1976. The academy was awarded the National Standard in 1979.

The Bangladesh Military Academy provides training to the officers of the Bangladesh Army. From 1983 the officers of the Bangladesh Navy and Air Force must take three months training from the academy.

The academy chose a verse by national poet Kazi Nazrul Islam, Chiro Unnata Momo Shir (translation: ever high is my head) as its motto. Regular long courses commenced from 1978. The first batch of officers of Bangladesh Army graduated from the academy on 11 January 1975.

Honour code

An Officer Cadet / Officer Cadet (Female) shall lead a life of Honour and Integrity. He / She shall not lie, cheat or steal

Mission 
To prepare the officer cadets for the grant of commission as officers in Bangladesh Army

Objective 

 To instill in the trainees the qualities of a leader imbibed with the national, societal and religious values, military tradition and dedication to a lifetime service to the nation.
 To train each Trainee Officer and Officer Cadet as a competent Infantry Platoon Commander committed to professionalism.
 To educate each Officer Cadet as a knowledgeable university graduate with inspiration to pursue higher education.

Training 

BMA provides military and academic training and character building. The academy primarily trains men and women to be commissioned into the Bangladesh Army. In addition, the academy conducts and orientation course for Bangladesh Civil Service (BCS) officers, officer cadets and midshipmen of the Bangladesh Air Force and Navy respectively, and Pre-Commission Training for professor/teacher under-officers of Bangladesh National Cadet Corps (BNCC). Long Course cadets graduating from this academy fall under Bangladesh University of Professionals (BUP) curriculum. The academy has the intention of fostering and inculcating those attributes in an Officer Cadet (OC) which will ensure his continuous and progressive development as a regular officer in the Bangladesh Army, and developing future officers for the Bangladesh Army by training the Officer Cadets in a way that they can make decisions as and when required by the military profession.

Training course
The training courses run at BMA are as follow:

 Long Course – 3 years.
 BMA Special Regular Course – 24 weeks.
 Basic Military Training Course – 24 weeks.
 Joint Services Course – 10 weeks (Bangladesh Navy cadets and  Bangladesh Air Force cadets).
 Direct Short Service Commission – 49 weeks 
 Potential Platoon Commanders Course – 05 weeks.
 Drill Instructor Course – 07 weeks.
 BCS Officers Orientation Course weeks (01 week in BMA) – 05 weeks.
 Post Commission Academic Training (PCAT) - Final Semester of Bangladesh University of Professionals (BUP) (4–6 months)

Tactical training

This includes lecture, tutorial discussion, model discussion, tactical exercise without troops, demonstration and field training exercise on all types of major and minor operations of war.

Field training exercise

First term 

a. Exercise Bajramusti – To impart the basic knowledge to the cadets/ trainee officers about formation of troops in patrol.

b. Exercise Padakkhep 1 – 1. To enhance the physical and mental endurance of cadets/ trainee officers in forced march in a difficult terrain.

c. Exercise Padakkhep 2 – 2. To enhance the physical and mental endurance of cadets in forced march in x-country route/ terrain.

d. Exercise Dhumketu  – To impart practical lesson to the cadets/ trainee officers in planning, preparation and conduct of raids.

e. Exercise Moronfad – To impart practical lesson to the cadets/ trainee officers on planning, preparation and conduct of ambush.

Second term 

f. Exercise Louhokapat – To impart practical lesson to the cadets on the technique and mechanism of positional defence at company level within the frame work of an Infantry Battalion.

Third term 

g. Exercise Ronogati – To impart practical lesson to the cadets in the application of principles, mechanism and conduct of day advance and attack at company level with special emphasis on platoon activities.

Fourth term 

h. Exercise Kashti Pathor 1 –. To impart practical lesson to the cadets/ trainee officers in all type of major operations of war. This tests the knowledge of defence learned in 2nd term.

Fifth term 

i. Exercise Kashti Pathor 2 – To impart practical lesson to the cadets/ trainee officers in all type of major operations of war. This tests the knowledge of attack and advance learned in 3rd term with some of the defence principles.

Final term 

j. Exercise Lalghora (Trojan Horse) – To impart practical lesson to the cadets in the technique of conducting minor operations behind enemy lines without being supplied and support from own side. Its on infiltration and other minor ops which are learned from previous terms.

Ancillary military training

a. Map Reading Exercise. To impart basic knowledge about Map Reading to the cadets and trainee officers. It includes Outdoor exercise on Map reading, Night marching, Uses of Global Positioning System etc.

b.  Demonstrations & Tactical Exercise Without Troops. Various Demonstrations and Tactical Exercise Without Troops on different operations (Major & Minor) are conducted in BMA for cadets throughout the term.

c. Weapon Training. To impart practical knowledge on handling and use of various types of weapon and develop firing efficiency.

d. Physical Training. To attain the highest standard of physical efficiency.

e. Field Engineer Training. To impart basic knowledge on field engineering.

f. Computer Training. To impart first hand knowledge on computer handling including MS word, Power Point and use of internet.

g. Signal Training. To impart working knowledge on wireless and signal equipment.

Academic training

This training is mainly conducted to prepare the cadets of long courses for qualifying in the Bachelor of Arts (BA)/ Bachelor of Science (BSc) (Pass Course) examinations. From 67 BMA Long Course there will be a common degree. That is Bachelor of Defence Studies (BDS). From 75 BMA Long Course there are 8 subjects to study: International relations, BBA, Economics, Physics, Computer Science, & Engineering, Electrical, Electronics & Communications Engineering, Mechanical Engineering, and Civil Engineering. And From 89 BMA L/C The Officer Cadets Will Study B.S.S (Bachelor Of Social Science) in Security Studies. The academic training also aimed at developing communication skill both in English and Bangla through oral and written expression, create awareness of current national, regional and international affairs, widen mental horizon and sense of reasoning.

Training visits

Training visits are conducted for the final term cadets.

Club activities

Rappelling Club

To develop the courage, confidence level, physical and mental stamina of a cadet, this club started its journey in the year 1989. Cadets of 2nd term & 3rd term can be the members of this club. The third term cadets near the end of term get an excellent opportunity to carry out rappelling from hovering helicopter.

Riding Club

This club was established to give the cadets basic knowledge of horse riding. Cadets of 2nd term & 3rd term can be the members of this club. This club has horse of various origins like Arabian, Indian, Pakistani & Bangladeshi.

Frogman Club

Normally the members of frogman club join Frogman Course. To meet this thrilling event, members of this club must have both physical and mental endurance. The frogman course is conducted under direct supervision of Bangladesh Navy. Cadets and Officers are awarded with Insignia after successful completion of course.

Arts and Crafts Club

The aim of this club is to find out the hidden talents from the cadets. It is one of the glorious opportunity to flourish their talents.

Cultural Club

The aim of this club is to ensure recreational facilities of cadets. Necessary equipment can be found there.

Computer Club

This club works on educating cadets about computer. Make them confident about handling of computer.

Publications
BMA has two publications namely CHIRO UNNOTO MOMO SHIR (EVER HIGH IS MY HEAD) is BMA magazine and PADAKHKHEP (ONWARD MARCH) a professional journal. Both the publications published once in a year.

Affiliation
The academy provides a three-year academic programme combined with intense military training. It is affiliated with the Bangladesh University of Professionals and provides 4-year bachelor's degrees. Every cadet has to study Military Science in this institution. They have to learn every thing practically.

Facilities
The academy has number of facilities required for Military Academies of international repute, which include
 Firing ranges
 Firing Simulator
 Close quarters combat ring
 Troops of Training Support Companies.
 Battle Inoculation Range
 Assault Course range
 Ambush filed
 Model Room for Tactical studies
 HD projection system in wide screen
 Classroom equipped with computer and projector
 Olympic Grade Swimming pool
 Rappelling Tower
 Confidence Tower
 Tiger Chase Ground
 Horse Riding ground
 Driving Track
 Language Lab
 Library
 Sports facilities
 Indoor PT Shed etc.

The academy has a Mosque.

Battalion
The academy has one battalion: 1st Bangladesh Battalion. It consists of four companies:

   Jahangir Company 
  Rouf Company 
  Hamid Company 
  Mustafa Company

See also
 School of Infantry and Tactics
 Bangladesh Naval Academy
 Bangladesh Air Force Academy

References

Further reading

External links
 Bangladesh Military Academy, in Banglapedia
 Bangladesh Military Academy (BMA) at Bangladesh Army

Bangladesh University of Professionals
Education in Chittagong
Military installations of Bangladesh
Military education and training in Bangladesh
Bangladesh Armed Forces education and training establishments
Military academies
Military education and training
Staff colleges